Cameraria jiulianshanica is a moth of the family Gracillariidae. It was described by Bai in 2015. It is found in China.

References

Cameraria (moth)
Moths described in 2015

Moths of Asia
Insects of China
Taxa named by Hai-Yan Bai